Super Bowl IX was an American football game played between the American Football Conference (AFC) champion Pittsburgh Steelers and the National Football Conference (NFC) champion Minnesota Vikings to decide the National Football League (NFL) champion for the 1974 season. The game was played on January 12, 1975, at Tulane Stadium in New Orleans, Louisiana. The Steelers defeated the Vikings by the score of 16–6 to win their first Super Bowl championship.

This game matched two of the NFL's best defenses and two future Pro Football Hall of Fame quarterbacks. Led by quarterback Terry Bradshaw and the Steel Curtain defense, the Steelers advanced to their first Super Bowl after posting a 10–3–1 regular-season record and playoff victories over the Buffalo Bills and the Oakland Raiders. The Vikings were led by quarterback Fran Tarkenton and the Purple People Eaters defense; they advanced to their second consecutive Super Bowl and third overall after finishing the regular season with a 10–4 record and defeating the St. Louis Cardinals and the Los Angeles Rams in the playoffs.

The first half of Super Bowl IX was a defensive struggle, with the lone score being the first safety in Super Bowl history when Tarkenton was downed in his own end zone. The Steelers then recovered a fumble on the second-half kickoff and scored on fullback Franco Harris's 9-yard run. The Vikings cut the score, 9–6, early in the fourth quarter by recovering a blocked punt in Pittsburgh's end zone for a touchdown, but the Steelers then drove 66 yards on their ensuing possession to score on Larry Brown's 4-yard touchdown reception to put the game out of reach.

In total, the Steelers limited the Vikings to Super Bowl record lows of nine first downs, 119 total offensive yards, 17 rushing yards, and no offensive scores (Minnesota's only score came on a blocked punt, and they did not even score on the extra point attempt).  The Steelers accomplished this despite losing starting linebackers Andy Russell and Jack Lambert, who were injured and replaced by Ed Bradley and Loren Toews for most of the second half.  On the other hand, Pittsburgh had 333 yards of total offense.  Harris, who ran for a Super Bowl record 158 yards (more than the entire Minnesota offense) and a touchdown, was named the Super Bowl's Most Valuable Player.

Background
The NFL awarded Super Bowl IX to New Orleans on April 3, 1973, at the owners' meetings held in Scottsdale, Arizona. This was the third time that the Super Bowl was played in New Orleans, after IV and VI. Super Bowl IX was originally planned to be held at the Louisiana Superdome, which was under construction at the time of the vote. However, construction delays at the Superdome (which pushed its opening to August 1975) forced the league to move the game to Tulane Stadium, where the city's previous two Super Bowls were held. This ended up being the last professional American football game played at Tulane Stadium.

For the second time, the owners selected two consecutive Super Bowl host cities at the same meeting. Only three cities submitted bids for the two games. Representatives from New Orleans, Miami, and Los Angeles each made presentations; all three cities had already hosted the Super Bowl. New Orleans impressed owners with their Superdome plans, and won a unanimous vote to host the game, while Miami was given Super Bowl X.

Pittsburgh Steelers

Pittsburgh advanced to their first Super Bowl and was playing for a league championship for the first time in team history. Their 73-year-old owner Art Rooney founded the Steelers as a 1933 NFL expansion team, but suffered through losing seasons for most of its 42-year history and had never made it to an NFL championship game or a Super Bowl. But in 1969, Rooney hired Chuck Noll to be the team's head coach and its fortunes started to turn following a disastrous 1–13 first year under the future Hall of Fame coach.

Noll rebuilt the Steelers through the NFL draft, selecting defensive tackle Joe Greene and defensive end L. C. Greenwood in his first season as head coach. In 1970, Noll drafted quarterback Terry Bradshaw and cornerback Mel Blount. In 1971, linebacker Jack Ham, defensive tackle Ernie Holmes, defensive end Dwight White, and safety Mike Wagner were selected by the team. Fullback Franco Harris was drafted in 1972. And in 1974, the Steelers picked linebacker Jack Lambert, center Mike Webster and wide receivers Lynn Swann and John Stallworth, and signed safety Donnie Shell as a free agent. Bradshaw, Webster, Swann, Stallworth, and Harris ended up being Hall of Fame players on offense, while the others formed the core nucleus of their "Steel Curtain" defense, including future Hall of Famers Greene, Ham, Blount, Lambert and Shell.

But en route to Super Bowl IX, the Steelers had started the regular season slowly, as Bradshaw and Joe Gilliam fought to be the team's starting quarterback. Gilliam had started for the first four games of the season, but Noll eventually made Bradshaw the starter. Although Bradshaw ended up completing only 67 out of 148 passes for 785 yards, 7 touchdowns, and 8 interceptions, he helped lead the team to a 10–3–1 regular-season record. The Steelers' main offensive weapon, however, was running the ball. Harris rushed for 1,006 yards and five touchdowns, while also catching 23 passes for 200 yards and another touchdown. Running backs Rocky Bleier, Preston Pearson, and Steve Davis also made important contributions, gaining a combined total of 936 yards and eight touchdowns.  Receiver Lynn Swann returned 41 punts for league-leading 577 yards and a touchdown.

But the Steelers' main strength during the season was their staunch "Steel Curtain" defense, which led the league with the fewest total yards allowed (3,074) and the fewest passing yards allowed (1,466). Greene won the NFL Defensive Player of the Year Award for the second time in the previous three seasons, and he and L. C. Greenwood were named to the Pro Bowl. Both of the team's outside linebackers, Ham and Andy Russell, had been also selected to play in the Pro Bowl, while Lambert already had two interceptions for 19 yards in his rookie year. In the defensive backfield, Blount, Wagner, and Glen Edwards made a strong impact against opposing passing plays.

Minnesota Vikings

The Vikings came into the season trying to redeem themselves after a one sided Super Bowl VIII loss after which they became the first team to lose two Super Bowls (the other loss was in Super Bowl IV).

Minnesota's powerful offense was still led by veteran quarterback Fran Tarkenton, who passed for 2,598 yards and 17 touchdowns. The Vikings' primary offensive weapon was running back Chuck Foreman, who led the team in receptions with 53 for 586 yards and six touchdowns. He was also their leading rusher with 777 rushing yards and nine touchdowns. Wide receivers Jim Lash and John Gilliam were major deep threats, having 32 receptions for 631 yards (a 19.7 yards per catch average) and 26 receptions for 578 yards (a 22.5 ypc average), respectively. Fullback Dave Osborn contributed with 514 rushing yards, and 29 receptions for 196 yards. And the Vikings' offensive line, led by future Hall of Famers right tackle Ron Yary and center Mick Tingelhoff, allowed only 17 sacks.

Aided by the "Purple People Eaters" defense, led by future Hall of Fame defensive linemen Carl Eller and Alan Page, and future Hall of Fame safety Paul Krause, the Vikings won the NFC Central for the sixth time in the previous seven seasons.  Linebacker Jeff Siemon had 2 interceptions and 3 fumble recoveries.  Minnesota's defense also featured cornerback Nate Wright, who led the team with 6 interceptions, and safety Jeff Wright, who had 4.

Playoffs

For the first time in four years, the Miami Dolphins were not able to advance to the Super Bowl. While the Steelers defeated the Buffalo Bills 32–14 in the first round, the favored Dolphins lost to the Oakland Raiders 28–26, giving up Raiders running back Clarence Davis' 8-yard touchdown reception with 26 seconds remaining in the game with a play now known as The Sea of Hands. The key play in the game occurred when the Dolphins were in control and were leading the Raiders 19–14 midway through the fourth quarter. Cliff Branch hauled in a 72-yard touchdown pass from Raiders quarterback Ken Stabler when third-year Dolphin defensive back Henry Stuckey, the man assigned to cover Branch on the play, fell down, and the resultant wide open Branch caught the bomb and sprinted to the end zone. After George Blanda kicked the PAT, the Raiders led 21-19. Dolphin fans were furious because fan favorite Lloyd Mumphord was replaced with Stuckey. Mumphord and head coach Don Shula were involved in a feud at the time, and it is thought that Stuckey was given the starting job for this game because of Shula's and Mumphord's differences of opinion. Afterwards, Stuckey was released in the offseason. Many believed that had Mumphord been in the game, there would have been no "Sea of Hands" play.

The Steelers defeated the Buffalo Bills 32–14 at home in the divisional round, then won the AFC Championship Game over the host Raiders, 24–13.

Meanwhile, Minnesota allowed only a combined 24 points in their playoff wins against the St. Louis Cardinals, 30–14, and their narrow defeat of the Los Angeles Rams, 14–10, after their defense stopped an attempted comeback touchdown drive from the Rams on the Vikings' own 2-yard line.

Super Bowl pregame news and notes
Sports writers and fans predicted that Super Bowl IX would be a low scoring game because of the two teams' defenses. The Steelers' "Steel Curtain" had led the AFC in fewest points allowed (189) and the Vikings' "Purple People Eaters" had only given up 195.

As the NFC was the designated "home team" for the game, by NFL rules at the time the Vikings were required to wear their purple jerseys. Although the league later relaxed the rule from Super Bowl XIII onwards, the Vikings would've likely worn their purple jerseys anyway, given that they've worn their purple jerseys at home for much of their history aside from a few games in the 1960s, when the NFL was encouraging (but not requiring) teams to wear white at home. This was the only one of the four Super Bowls the Steelers of the 1970s played in that the team wore their white jerseys, and the only Super Bowl the team would wear white at all until Super Bowl XL 31 years later.

This was the first post-merger Super Bowl to not feature an East Division team from either conference. The previous season's Vikings were the only non-East Division team to appear in any of the previous four Super Bowls.

Game conditions
When the NFL awarded Super Bowl IX to New Orleans on April 3, 1973, the game was originally scheduled to be played at the Louisiana Superdome. By July 1974, construction on the dome was not yet finished, and so the league reverted to Tulane Stadium, home field for Tulane University and the New Orleans Saints, and site of Super Bowls IV and VI. Dolphins owner Joe Robbie lobbied the NFL to move Super Bowl IX to the Orange Bowl, already scheduled to host Super Bowl X, and give New Orleans the January 1976 game, but the proposal was rejected.

This proved to be quite pivotal, because of the inclement conditions (low temperature and the field was slick from overnight rain). This was the last Super Bowl to be played in inclement weather for over thirty years, until Super Bowl XLI (and that game's weather issues in Miami were based on a driving rain, not the temperature). (Seven Super Bowls - XVI in Pontiac, XXVI and LII in Minneapolis, XXVIII and XXXIV in Atlanta, XL in Detroit and XLVI in Indianapolis - have had colder outdoor temperatures but were played fixed-roof stadiums, except XLVI at the retractable-roofed Lucas Oil Stadium.)

The change of venue meant this was not only the last of three Super Bowls played at Tulane Stadium, but the last professional game played in the stadium, which was demolished five years later and replaced for the 1975 NFL season by the Louisiana Superdome, which has hosted every Super Bowl held in New Orleans since.

The circumstances surrounding Super Bowl IX prompted the NFL to adopt a rule prohibiting a new stadium from hosting the Super Bowl following its first regular season.

Broadcasting
The game was broadcast in the United States by NBC with play-by-play announcer Curt Gowdy and color commentators Al DeRogatis and Don Meredith. Charlie Jones served as the event's field reporter and covered the trophy presentation; while hosting the coverage was NBC News reporter Jack Perkins and Jeannie Morris (Morris, then the wife of former Chicago Bears wide receiver and WMAQ-TV sports anchor Johnny Morris, became the first woman to participate in Super Bowl coverage). Prior to the 1975 NFL season, NBC did not have a regular pregame show.

The Mary Tyler Moore Show on CBS (which was set in Minneapolis) used this game as a plot line on the episode aired the night before the game. Lou Grant taught Ted Baxter how to bet on football games; yet over the course of the football season, Ted was the one who developed a winning strategy. They pooled their money and finished the regular season in the black. Since Ted's strategy would not work on the Super Bowl game's spread, it was agreed they would not place a bet on the Super Bowl. However Ted was crushed when it was revealed that Lou actually did place a (losing) bet. Lou bet all the season's winnings on the Steelers. At the end of the show, Mary Tyler Moore announced the following over the credits: "If the Pittsburgh Steelers win the actual Super Bowl tomorrow, we want to apologize to the Pittsburgh team and their fans for this purely fictional story. If on the other hand, they lose, remember, you heard it here first." And, as it turned out, her apology did go into effect.

Entertainment
The Grambling State University Band from north Louisiana performed during both the pregame festivities and the national anthem. Coincidentally, Tulane Stadium hosted the first Bayou Classic football game between Southwestern Athletic Conference archrivals Grambling and Southern seven weeks before the Super Bowl. 

During the national anthem, the GSU band was backed by the Mardi Gras Barbershop Chorus under the direction of Dr. Saul Schneider. The halftime show was a tribute to American jazz composer, pianist and bandleader Duke Ellington, also featuring the Grambling State University Band along with Ellington's son Mercer. Ellington had died the previous May.

Game summary
As many predicted, the game was low scoring; both teams failed to score a touchdown or a field goal until the third quarter and ended up with the third lowest total of combined points in Super Bowl history.

First quarter
The first quarter of Super Bowl IX was completely dominated by both teams' defenses. The Vikings were limited to 20 passing yards, zero rushing yards, and one first down. The Steelers did slightly better with 18 passing yards, 61 rushing yards, and four first downs. Pittsburgh even managed to get close enough for their kicker Roy Gerela to attempt two field goals, but Gerela missed his first attempt, and a bad snap prevented the second one from getting off the ground.

Second quarter
In the second quarter, the Vikings got an opportunity to score when defensive back Randy Poltl recovered a fumble from halfback Rocky Bleier at the Steelers' 24-yard line, but they could only move the ball two yards in their next three plays, and kicker Fred Cox missed a 39-yard field goal attempt. The Steelers then converted a third down with the longest gain so far in the game, a 22-yard pass from Terry Bradshaw to John Stallworth. Pittsburgh was forced to punt, but Bobby Walden booted a 39-yarder, and rookie Sam McCullum did not allow the ball to reach the end zone, then failed to make a return and was downed at the Viking 7-yard line. The first score of the game occurred two plays later, when halfback Dave Osborn fumbled a pitch from Tarkenton at the 10, and the ball rolled backward and across the goal line. Tarkenton quickly dove on the ball in the end zone to prevent a Steeler touchdown, but he was downed by Dwight White for a safety, giving Pittsburgh a 2–0 lead. It was the first safety scored in Super Bowl history. The Vikings forced a three-and-out, then threatened to score when Tarkenton led them on a 55-yard drive to the Steelers' 20-yard line. With 1:17 left in the half, Tarkenton threw a pass to receiver John Gilliam at the 5-yard line, but Steelers safety Glen Edwards hit him just as he caught the ball. The ball popped out of his hands and right into the arms of Mel Blount for an interception.

The half ended with the Steelers leading 2–0, the lowest halftime score in Super Bowl history and lowest possible, barring a scoreless tie.

Third quarter
On the opening kickoff of the second half, Minnesota's Bill Brown lost a fumble on an unintentional squib kick after Gerela slipped on the wet field and only extended his leg halfway for the kick. Marv Kellum recovered the ball for Pittsburgh at the Vikings' 30-yard line. Franco Harris then moved the ball to the 6-yard line with a 24-yard run. After being tackled for a three-yard loss, Harris carried the ball for nine yards and a touchdown, giving the Steelers a 9–0 lead.

After an exchange of punts, Minnesota got the ball back on their own 20-yard line. On the second play of drive, Tarkenton's pass was deflected behind the line of scrimmage by Pittsburgh defensive lineman L. C. Greenwood, and bounced back right into the arms of Tarkenton, who then threw a 41-yard completion to Gilliam. Officials ruled Tarkenton's first pass attempt was a completion to himself, and thus his second attempt was an illegal forward pass. After the penalty, facing third and 11, Minnesota got the first down with running back Chuck Foreman's 12-yard run. Three plays later, Tarkenton completed a 28-yard pass to tight end Stu Voigt at the Steelers' 45-yard line. But White deflected Tarkenton's next pass attempt, and Joe Greene intercepted the ball, ending the Vikings' best offensive scoring opportunity.

Fourth quarter
Early in the fourth quarter, the Vikings got another scoring opportunity when Minnesota safety Paul Krause recovered a fumble from Harris on the Steelers' 47-yard line. On the next play, a deep pass attempt from Tarkenton to Gilliam drew a 42-yard pass interference penalty on Pittsburgh defensive back Mike Wagner that moved the ball up to the 5-yard line. Once again, the Steelers stopped them from scoring when Greene forced and recovered a fumble from Foreman. Pittsburgh failed to get a first down on their next possession and was forced to punt from deep in their own territory. Minnesota linebacker Matt Blair burst through the line to block the punt, and Terry Brown recovered the ball in the end zone for a touchdown. Cox missed the extra point, but the Vikings had cut their deficit to 9–6 and were just a field goal away from a tie.

However, on the ensuing drive, the Steelers put the game out of reach with a 66-yard, 11-play scoring drive that took 6:47 off the clock and featured three successful third down conversions. The first was a key 30-yard pass completion from Bradshaw to tight end Larry Brown. Brown fumbled the ball as he was being tackled, and two officials (back judge Ray Douglas and field judge Dick Dolack) initially ruled the ball recovered for the Vikings by Jeff Siemon, but head linesman Ed Marion overruled their call, stating that Brown was downed at the contact before the ball came out of his hands.  Faced with 2nd and 15 after a penalty, Pittsburgh then fooled the Vikings defense with a misdirection play.  Harris ran left past Bradshaw after the snap, drawing in the defense with him, while Bleier took a handoff and ran right through a gaping hole in the line for a 17-yard gain to the Vikings 16-yard line. A few plays later, Bradshaw converted a 3rd and 5 situation with 6-yard pass to Bleier that put the ball on the Vikings' 5-yard line. The Steelers gained just one yard with their next two plays, setting up third and goal from the four. Bradshaw's 4-yard touchdown pass to Brown on third down gave the Steelers a 16–6 lead with only 3:31 remaining.

Vikings running back Brent McClanahan returned the ensuing kickoff 22 yards to the 39-yard line, but on the first play of the drive, Tarkenton's pass was intercepted by Wagner. The Steelers then executed 7 consecutive running plays, taking the game clock all the way down to 38 seconds remaining before turning the ball over on downs.

Harris finished the game with 34 carries for a Super Bowl record 158 yards and a touchdown; Harris' record stood until the Washington Redskins' John Riggins rushed for 166 yards in Super Bowl XVII. Bleier had 65 rushing yards, and two receptions for 11 yards. Pittsburgh finished with a total of 57 rushing attempts, which remains the Super Bowl record through Super Bowl LV. Bradshaw completed nine out of 14 passes for 96 yards and a touchdown. Tarkenton completed 11 of 26 passes for 102 yards with 3 interceptions, for a passer rating of only 14.1. Foreman was the Vikings' top offensive contributor, finishing the game as the team's leading rusher and receiver with 18 rushing yards and 50 receiving yards.

The loss was the Vikings' record-setting third in Super Bowl play. Bud Grant vented frustration by saying, "There were three bad teams out there - us, Pittsburgh and the officials.” Minnesota, among many negatives to this point in its Super Bowl history of three games, had only two scoring drives on offense, and only three turnovers forced on defense, none of which resulted in any points. The win made the Steelers' Chuck Noll the youngest head coach to win the Super Bowl at the time (He was 42 years, 7 days).

Box score

Final statistics
Sources: NFL.com Super Bowl IX, Super Bowl IX Play Finder Pit, Super Bowl IX Play Finder Min

Statistical comparison

Individual statistics

1Completions/attempts
2Carries
3Long gain
4Receptions
5Times targeted

Records set
The following records were set or tied in Super Bowl IX, according to the official NFL.com boxscore and the ProFootball reference.com game summary. Some records have to meet NFL minimum number of attempts to be recognized. The minimums are shown (in parenthesis). 
 

 † This category includes rushing, receiving, interception returns, punt returns, kickoff returns, and fumble returns.
 ‡ Sacks an official statistic since Super Bowl XVII by the NFL. Sacks are listed as "Tackled Attempting to Pass" in the official NFL box score for Super Bowl II.

Turnovers are defined as the number of times losing the ball on interceptions and fumbles.

Starting lineups
Source:

Officials
 Referee: Bernie Ulman #6, second Super Bowl on field (I as head linesman); alternate for VI
 Umpire: Al Conway #27, first Super Bowl
 Head Linesman: Ed Marion #26, second Super Bowl (V)
 Line Judge: Bruce Alford #24, third Super Bowl (II, VII)
 Back Judge: Ray Douglas #5, first Super Bowl
 Field Judge: Dick Dolack #31, first Super Bowl
 Alternate Referee: Fred Silva #81, worked Super Bowl XIV as referee

Bruce Alford was the first official to be honored with three Super Bowl assignments.

Bernie Ulman was the first official to be the referee for a Super Bowl after working a previous Super Bowl at another position. This would not happen again until Dick Hantak was the referee for Super Bowl XXVII after serving as back judge for Super Bowl XVII.

Note: A seven-official system was not used until the  season

References

 Super Bowl official website
 
 
 
 
 https://www.pro-football-reference.com – Large online database of NFL data and statistics
 Super Bowl play-by-plays from USA Today (Last accessed September 28, 2005)
 All-Time Super Bowl Odds from The Sports Network (Last accessed October 16, 2005)

Pittsburgh Steelers postseason
Minnesota Vikings postseason
Super Bowl
1974 National Football League season
American football competitions in New Orleans
1975 in sports in Louisiana
January 1975 sports events in the United States
1970s in New Orleans